phpCodeGenie is a code generator for web applications. Once the user designs their database tables, phpCodeGenie generates the scripts and programs. It will build data entry forms, insert scripts, database lister scripts, edit record forms, update record scripts, delete confirmation scripts, delete scripts, search forms, search scripts and other frontend/database interaction code.

As a code generator for database-driven applications, it also can be considered as a CASE tool.  It generates the core CRUD code in SQL and the basic front end for PHP and Java applications. It can communicate with multiple databases such as: MySQL, PostgreSQL, ODBC, SQLite, Oracle, IBM Db2, MS SQL Server, MaxDB, Visual FoxPro, FrontBase, InterBase, Firebird, Informix, LDAP, Netezza, SAP DB, Sybase, and generate code from them.

See also 

 Comparison of web frameworks

External links
 PHPCodeGenie Sourceforge site
  
 List of opensource software from Nilesh Dosooye
 PHPCodeGenie profile in Code Generation Network
 PHPCodeGenie profile in FSF/Unesco Free Software Directory

Web frameworks